Octans Aircraft is a Brazilian manufacturer of light aircraft, located at São João da Boa Vista, São Paulo.

History
The origins of Octans Aircraft date to 2002, when INPAER (Portuguese: Indústria Paulista de Aeronáutica) was founded as a light aircraft manufacturer, producing more than 240 light sport aircraft. In 2013, banker Milton Roberto Pereira bought a third of the shares in the company and focused the company on the type certified aircraft market. Investments resulted in modernizing the company's plant and adopting Siemens Digital Industries Software to speed product development and certification.

Following the restructuring, in the 2017 the company was renamed Octans Aircraft and a new light aircraft project announced, the 300A. It was later renamed the Octans Cygnus. In early 2018, Octans Aircraft announced that it has sold INPAER's previous design rights to a former owner. The first Cygnus prototype was completed and the National Civil Aviation Agency of Brazil certification process commenced, with deliveries forecast for the second half of 2021.

Aircraft

See also
Aero Bravo
Companhia Aeronáutica Paulista
List of aircraft manufacturers

References

External links

Aircraft manufacturers of Brazil
Companies based in São Paulo (state)
Brazilian brands